Wilhelm Max Müller (15 May 1862 – 12 July 1919) was a German-born American orientalist.

Biography
Müller was born at Gleißenberg, Germany. He received his higher education in Erlangen, Berlin, Munich, and Leipzig, where he received his Ph.D. He was one of the last students of the Egyptologist Georg Ebers.

Müller emigrated to the United States in 1888. He was a professor at the Reformed Episcopal Seminary in Philadelphia beginning in 1890. During several years (1904, 1906, 1910), he engaged in archaeological work in Egypt for the Carnegie Institution. He lectured on Egyptology at the University of Pennsylvania, and purchased papyri in Egypt for the University Museum.

He died in a drowning accident in Wildwood, New Jersey, in July 1919.

Works
 Asien und Europa nach altägyptischen Denkmälern (lit. "Asia and Europe on Egyptian Monuments", 1893)
 Die Liebespoesie der alten Ägypter (lit. "The Love Poetry of the Ancient Egyptians", 1899)
 Egyptian Mythology, vol. XII in Marshall Jones, ed., The Mythology of All Races, Boston, 1918; New York: Dover, 2005, 

He was a contributor to the Encyclopædia Biblica and the Jewish Encyclopædia. After 1905 he served as joint editor of the Gesenius Hebrew Dictionary''.

He wrote on the identification of Keftiu and concluded that it could not be Phoenicia.

Further reading
On his involvement with the acquisition and early organization of the papyri and related materials in the Egyptology collection at the University of Pennsylvania Museum, see

Notes

References

External links

1862 births
1919 deaths
Reformed Episcopal Seminary faculty
American archaeologists
American lexicographers
American orientalists
American Egyptologists
Humboldt University of Berlin alumni
Leipzig University alumni
German emigrants to the United States
19th-century American Episcopalians